The Sir Samuel Hall Chair of Chemistry is the named Chair of Chemistry in the School of Chemistry at the University of Manchester, established through an endowment of £36,000 in 1913 by the Hall family. This chair has been occupied by the following chemists:

 2014- David Alan Leigh FRS
 2005 - 2014 Ian Hillier
 1947-1954   Sir Ewart Jones FRS
 1944-1947   Sir Edmund Hirst FRS
 1938-1944   Alexander R. Todd, Baron Todd FRS
 1935-1938   Sir Ian Heilbron FRS
 1922-1935 Arthur Lapworth FRS

References 

Chemistry, Hall, Sir Samuel
Chemistry, Hall, Sir Samuel